Kelvin Wayne Clark (born January 30, 1956) is a former American college and professional football player who was an Offensive lineman in the National Football League (NFL) for seven seasons in the 1970s and 1980s.  He played college football for the University of Nebraska, and was recognized as an All-American.  A first-round pick in the 1979 NFL Draft, Clark played professionally for the Denver Broncos and New Orleans Saints of the NFL.

Clark was born in Odessa, Texas.

1956 births
Living people
All-American college football players
American football offensive guards
American football offensive tackles
Denver Broncos players
Nebraska Cornhuskers football players
New Orleans Saints players
People from Odessa, Texas
Players of American football from Texas